Carlos Vegh Garzón (Montevideo, 1902–1984) was a Uruguayan politician.

Background

He was a prominent member of the Uruguayan Colorado Party.

Public offices
He served as Minister of Economy and Finance in 1967, under President Oscar Gestido. A year later, he was President of the Banco de la República Oriental del Uruguay.

Personal

Son of Alejandro Végh and Sofia Garzon. His grandfather Sándor Végh was a Hungarian military officer who migrated to Uruguay in the mid-19th century.
   
Married to Sofia Villegas Suárez (a great-granddaughter of President Joaquín Suárez).  Had six children, including Alejandro Vegh Villegas, who was Minister of the Economy in 1974-1976 and again in 1982–1983.  His grandson, Carlos A. Vegh, is an academic economist.

See also

 Politics of Uruguay
 List of political families#Uruguay

References
 :es:Carlos Garzón

References

1902 births
1984 deaths
People from Montevideo
Uruguayan people of Hungarian descent
Uruguayan people of Spanish descent
Colorado Party (Uruguay) politicians
Ministers of Economics and Finance of Uruguay